A list of films produced by the Marathi language film industry based in Maharashtra in the year 2011.

January – March

April – June

July – September

October – December

References
28.      "Ashi fasile nana chi Tanng"(2011).

External links
 

2011
Marathi
2011 in Indian cinema